Ostomopsis is a genus of minute bark beetles in the family Cerylonidae. There are at least three described species in Ostomopsis.

Species
These three species belong to the genus Ostomopsis:
 Ostomopsis kuscheli Slipinski
 Ostomopsis neotropicalis Lawrence & Stephan, 1975
 Ostomopsis watti Slipinski

References

Further reading

 
 
 

Cerylonidae
Articles created by Qbugbot
Coccinelloidea genera